Tverrnipa Peak is a peak, 2,195 m, surmounting the north end of Tverrveggen Ridge in the Sverdrup Mountains, Queen Maud Land. Photographed from the air by the German Antarctic Expedition (1938–39). Mapped by Norwegian cartographers from surveys and air photos by Norwegian-British-Swedish Antarctic Expedition (NBSAE) (1949–52) and air photos by the Norwegian expedition (1958–59) and named Tverrnipa (the transverse peak).

Mountains of Queen Maud Land
Princess Martha Coast